Birmingham School may refer to:

Schools of thought
 The Birmingham School (cultural studies), associated with the Centre for Contemporary Cultural Studies
 Birmingham School (economics), 19th century underconsumptionist economists led by Thomas Attwood
 The style associated with the artists of the Birmingham Group (artists)
 Birmingham School (landscape artists), 18th and 19th century landscape artists
 Birmingham School (engravers), 19th century line-engravers

Educational institutions
 Birmingham Business School
 Royal Birmingham Conservatoire, formerly the Birmingham School of Music
 Birmingham Medical School
 Birmingham School of Art